Powellville is a former town on U.S. Highway 66, now an outer road of Interstate 44 in western Phelps County, Missouri, United States.

Powellville was constructed in the late 1920s or early 1930s, with a small motel to serve the drivers of Powell Brothers Truck Line. They traveled from southwest Missouri to St. Louis with freight.

References

Unincorporated communities in Phelps County, Missouri
Unincorporated communities in Missouri